Hamady Barro N'Diaye (pronounced HAH-muh-dee EN-jigh; born January 12, 1987) is a Senegalese professional basketball player for Nanterre 92 of the LNB Pro A. A 7-foot tall center, N'Diaye played college basketball for Rutgers University and was a second-round selection in the 2010 NBA draft.

Early life
N'Diaye grew up in Senegal and came to the United States to attend high school at Stoneridge Preparatory School in Simi Valley, California. He played soccer in childhood and began playing basketball as a high school student.

College career
During his senior year at Rutgers University, N'Diaye had 145 blocks and averaged 4.5 blocks per game (the third highest in the nation). On March 9, 2010, during a 69–68 loss to Cincinnati in the Big East Tournament, N'Diaye ended the season with the 358 blocked shots in his career. He broke school records held by former NBA player Roy Hinson. N'Diaye was awarded the Big East Defensive Player of the Year.

Professional career
On June 24, 2010, N'Diaye was drafted by the Minnesota Timberwolves with the 56th overall pick in the 2010 NBA draft. His draft rights were then traded to the Washington Wizards. On January 6, 2011, N'Diaye was assigned to the Dakota Wizards of the NBA D-League. He was recalled on February 4, 2011. On December 10, 2011, he re-signed with the Wizards. On January 1, 2012, N'Diaye was assigned to the Iowa Energy. On January 30, he was recalled. On February 7, 2012, he was waived by the Wizards. On February 27, 2012, he was acquired by the Maine Red Claws of the NBA D-League. In April 2012, he joined Guangzhou Liu Sui Whampoa of China.

In July 2012, he joined the Indiana Pacers for the Orlando Summer League and the Charlotte Bobcats for the Las Vegas Summer League. On September 25, 2012, he signed with the Sacramento Kings. However, he was waived on October 26. In November 2012, he joined Tianjin RongGang of China for the 2012–13 season.

He joined the Dallas Mavericks for the 2013 NBA Summer League. On August 29, 2013, N'Diaye's rights were acquired by the Delaware 87ers in the 2013 NBA Development League Expansion Draft. In September 2013, he signed with the Sacramento Kings. On December 6, 2013, the Kings assigned N'Diaye to the Reno Bighorns of the NBA D-League. He was recalled the next day. On January 3, 2014, he was reassigned to the Bighorns. He was recalled the next day. On January 6, 2014, he was waived by the Kings.

On January 25, 2014, he was acquired by the Delaware 87ers. On March 10, 2014, he was waived by the 87ers due to a season-ending injury. In May 2014, he joined Guangxi Rhinos of China.

On September 17, 2014, he signed with the Brooklyn Nets. However, two days later, his contract was voided by the Nets after he failed the required physical. In November 2014, he signed with Byblos of the Lebanese Basketball League. On April 29, 2015, he signed with Kia Carnival of the Philippine Basketball Association.

On August 18, 2015, he signed with Bnei Herzliya of the Israeli Basketball Premier League.

In July 2016,  N'Diaye signed with the Philippines-based basketball club, Mighty Sports PH at the 38th William Jones Cup and later on winning the gold medal for the club with an unbeaten record of 8–0.

On September 23, 2016, N'Diaye signed a one-year deal with the Spanish club Unicaja Málaga. On January 31, 2017, he parted ways with Unicaja. Two days later, he returned to his former club Bnei Herzliya.

On August 18, 2017, N'Diaye signed with the Italian team Sidigas Avellino for the 2017–18 season. After averaging 5.4 points and 3.7 rebounds per game, he re-signed with the team on August 9, 2018.

On July 31, 2019, he has signed with BCM Gravelines-Dunkerque of the LNB Pro A. N'Diaye averaged 6.2 points and 3.9 rebounds per game.

On August 19, 2020, he signed with Boulazac Basket Dordogne. Without playing any competitive game with BBD, he has signed with Élan Béarnais of the French LNB Pro A on October 19, 2020.

On June 21, 2022, he has signed with Nanterre 92 of the LNB Pro A.

Personal
N'Diaye is a member of the Iota Phi Theta fraternity.

References

External links
NBA.com Profile
Eurobasket.com Profile
FIBA.com Profile

1987 births
Living people
2014 FIBA Basketball World Cup players
2019 FIBA Basketball World Cup players
Baloncesto Málaga players
Basketball players from Dakar
BCM Gravelines players
Bnei Hertzeliya basketball players
Boulazac Basket Dordogne players
Centers (basketball)
Dakota Wizards players
Delaware 87ers players
Élan Béarnais players
Iowa Energy players
Israeli Basketball Premier League players
Lega Basket Serie A players
Liga ACB players
Maine Red Claws players
Minnesota Timberwolves draft picks
National Basketball Association players from Senegal
Philippine Basketball Association imports
Reno Bighorns players
Rutgers Scarlet Knights men's basketball players
S.S. Felice Scandone players
Sacramento Kings players
Senegalese expatriate basketball people in China
Senegalese expatriate basketball people in France
Senegalese expatriate basketball people in Italy
Senegalese expatriate basketball people in the Philippines
Senegalese expatriate basketball people in Spain
Senegalese expatriate basketball people in the United States
Terrafirma Dyip players
Tianjin Pioneers players
Washington Wizards players